Mocis latipes, the small mocis moth or striped grass looper, is a species of moth of the family Erebidae. It is found from North America (from southern Ontario and Quebec to Florida, west to Arizona, north to Minnesota and south through Central to South America.

The forewings are yellowish brown variably shaded with darker brown. Females are more yellowish to reddish than the males. The hindwings are yellowish brown with dark brown shading and two faint lines. Adults are on wing from June to October.

The larvae feed on various grasses, including rice and corn. They have also been recorded feeding on beans and turnip.

References

External links

latipes
Moths of North America
Moths of South America
Moths described in 1852